Franklin Harper Elmore (October 15, 1799May 29, 1850) was a United States representative and Senator. Born in Laurens District, the son of John Archer Elmore, he graduated from the South Carolina College at Columbia in 1819, studied law, was admitted to the bar in 1821 and commenced practice in Walterboro.

He was solicitor for the southern circuit from 1822–36, a colonel on the staff of the state governor from 1824–26, and was elected as a State Rights Democrat to the 24th United States Congress to fill the vacancy caused by the resignation of James H. Hammond. Elmore was reelected to the 25th Congress and served from December 10, 1836, to March 4, 1839. From 1839-50, he was president of the Bank of the State of South Carolina 1839-50; he declined appointment by President James Polk as Minister to Great Britain. Elmore was appointed as a Democrat to the U.S. Senate to fill the vacancy caused by the death of John C. Calhoun and served from April 11, 1850, until his own death in Washington, D.C., in 1850. He was interred in the First Presbyterian Churchyard in Columbia.

See also
List of United States Congress members who died in office (1790–1899)

References

External links

1799 births
1850 deaths
South Carolina lawyers
University of South Carolina alumni
Nullifier Party members of the United States House of Representatives
Nullifier Party politicians
19th-century American politicians
South Carolina state solicitors
Democratic Party United States senators from South Carolina
Democratic Party members of the United States House of Representatives from South Carolina
People from Walterboro, South Carolina
19th-century American lawyers